The Wild Basin Ranger Station is located in the southeastern portion of Rocky Mountain National Park, Colorado. Built in 1932, the ranger station is an example of National Park Service rustic architecture, built to plans by the National Park Service Branch of Plans and Design. The log structure is roofed with wood shingles and rests on a concrete foundation. The interior consists of three rooms, used for administrative and residential purposes.

The station features a steeply-pitched gable roof, overhanging to form a porch at the front.  The porch section of the roof is supported by corbeled logs at each end. The ranger station was placed on the National Register of Historic Places on January 29, 1988. The Wild Basin House, also listed on the NRHP, is located nearby.

See also
National Register of Historic Places listings in Boulder County, Colorado

References

National Register of Historic Places in Rocky Mountain National Park
National Park Service rustic in Colorado
Government buildings completed in 1932
Buildings and structures in Boulder County, Colorado
Park buildings and structures on the National Register of Historic Places in Colorado
National Park Service ranger stations
National Register of Historic Places in Boulder County, Colorado
1932 establishments in Colorado